The 1986 Southern Conference men's basketball tournament took place from February 28 – March 2, 1986, at the Asheville Civic Center in Asheville, North Carolina. The Davidson Wildcats, led by head coach Bobby Hussey, won their fifth Southern Conference title and received the automatic berth to the 1986 NCAA tournament.

Format
The top eight finishers of the conference's nine members were eligible for the tournament. Teams were seeded based on conference winning percentage. The tournament used a preset bracket consisting of three rounds.

Bracket

* Overtime game

See also
List of Southern Conference men's basketball champions

References

Tournament
Southern Conference men's basketball tournament
Southern Conference men's basketball tournament
Southern Conference men's basketball tournament
Southern Conference men's basketball tournament
Basketball competitions in Asheville, North Carolina
College sports tournaments in North Carolina
College basketball in North Carolina